Ricardo Hernández (born January 23, 1988) is a Venezuelan professional baseball player, who is currently with Nettuno Baseball City of the Italian Baseball League. 

He signed as an amateur free agent with the Florida Marlins in 2006. After a year in the Venezuelan Summer League and another in the Dominican Summer League he moved to the U.S. and played for the Gulf Coast Marlins in 2008 and the Jupiter Hammerheads in 2009. He moved to Spain and joined the División de Honor de Béisbol. After winning the league championship in 2011 (with a record of 15-0 and a 0.82 ERA in 17 games) he jumped to the Italian Baseball League in 2012 to play for Danesi Nettuno.

He played for the Spain national baseball team in the  2013 World Baseball Classic and the 2019 European Baseball Championship. He then played for the team at the Africa/Europe 2020 Olympic Qualification tournament, in Italy in September 2019.

References

External links

1988 births
Baseball pitchers
Living people
2013 World Baseball Classic players
2019 European Baseball Championship players
Caribes de Anzoátegui players
Gulf Coast Marlins players
Jupiter Hammerheads players
Rimini Baseball Club players
Venezuelan expatriate baseball players in Italy